A heretic is a person who commits heresy.

Heretic or The Heretic may also refer to:

Books
 Heretic (novel), the third volume in The Grail Quest series by Bernard Cornwell
 Heretic: Why Islam Needs a Reformation Now, a 2015 book by Ayaan Hirsi Ali
 Heretics (book), a 1905 collection of essays by G. K. Chesterton
 Heretic, an autobiography by Peter Cameron

Film and theatre
 Exorcist II: The Heretic, a 1977 American horror film
 Heretic (play), a 1996 play by David Williamson
 The Heretic (play), a 2011 play by Richard Bean
 The Heretics, a 2009 American documentary film
 The Heretics (2017 film), a 2017 Canadian horror film

Music
 Heretic (band), an American speed and thrash metal band

Albums
 Heretic (Morbid Angel album), 2003
 Heretic (Naked City album), 1991
 Heretics (Toadies album), 2015

Songs
 "Heretic", a song by Avenged Sevenfold from the 2013 album Hail to the King
 "Heretic", a song by Soundgarden from the 1986 album Deep Six

Other uses
 Heretic (ballet), a ballet by Martha Graham
 Heretic (video game), a 1994 game by Raven Software
 Heretic II, a 1998 sequel to the aforementioned video game
 Heretic Films, an American film production company
 Heretics Society, a group at Cambridge University which questioned traditional authorities and religious dogmas
 The Heretic, an antagonist of Damian Wayne and in the 2016 film Batman: Bad Blood

See also
 Heresy (disambiguation)